The 1981 Presto Fun Drinks season was the seventh season of the franchise in the Philippine Basketball Association (PBA).

Transactions

Summary
Jimmy Mariano takes over from fellow olympian Alfonso "Boy" Marquez on the Presto bench at the start of the season. The Presto Fun Drinkers had a pair of Harold Johnson and Myles Patrick for their imports in the Open Conference. After two games, Patrick was replaced by Earl Tatum, who played four games before getting injured and left without any replacement.

The handicap ruling favored the team in the Reinforced Filipino Conference as the Fun Drinkers enlisted the services of Lew Massey, often called "Sweet Lew", Massey is a prolific scoring machine from North Carolina State and the second round pick of the Los Angeles Lakers in the 1978 NBA Draft.

The Fun Drinkers enters the quarterfinal phase of the Reinforced Filipino Conference with a 5–4 won-loss slate. Presto made it to the semifinal round along with Crispa, U-Tex and Yco-Tanduay by winning three of their five outings in the round of six.

On the last playing date of the semifinals on November 14, the Fun Drinkers beat Yco-Tanduay, 121–114, to finish with three wins and three losses and tied with Crispa, which beat first finalist U-Tex in the nightcap. The CFC ballclub lost to the Redmanizers, 114–119, in the playoff game on November 17 in their closest bid to advance in the championship for the first time.

Won-loss record vs Opponents

Awards
Rafael "Cho" Sison was voted the season's Rookie of the year.

Roster

References

Presto
Great Taste Coffee Makers seasons